Dabo is a commune in the Moselle department in Grand Est in north-eastern France.

History 
Previous names: Dasburch (1188), Dasburg (1189) Dagesburg (1227), Tagesburg (1239), Dagespurg (1313), Dachspurg (1576).
An informal Franco-German summit between President Mitterrand and Chancellor Kohl took place in Dabo July 19, 1983.

Population

See also 
 Communes of the Moselle department

References

External links 
 

Communes of Moselle (department)